Senator Kenney may refer to:

Bill Kenney (born 1955), Missouri State Senate
Joseph Kenney (born 1960), New Hampshire State Senate
Richard R. Kenney (1856–1931), U.S. Senator from Delaware from 1897 to 1901
Bernard Kenny (born 1946), New Jersey State Senate
Robert W. Kenny (1901–1976), California State Senate